The Turu or Nyaturu language, Kinyaturu, also known as Rimi Kirimi, is a Bantu language of spoken by the Wanyaturu also known as Arimi of the Singida region of Tanzania. Excluding the Bantu language prefixes Ke- and Ki-, other spellings of the language are Limi and Remi. Dialects of the three Turu tribes are Girwana of the Airwana (Wilwana) in the north, Giahi of the Vahi (Wahi) in the south and west, and Ginyamunyinganyi of the Anyiŋanyi (Wanyinganyi) in the east.

References

Languages of Tanzania
Northeast Bantu languages